Materialism and Empirio-criticism (Russian: Материализм и эмпириокритицизм, Materializm i empiriokrititsizm) is a philosophical work by Vladimir Lenin, published in 1909. It was an obligatory subject of study in all institutions of higher education in the Soviet Union, as a seminal work of dialectical materialism, a part of the curriculum called "Marxist–Leninist Philosophy". Lenin argued that human perceptions correctly and accurately reflect an objective external world.

Lenin formulates the fundamental philosophical contradiction between idealism and materialism as follows:
"Materialism is the recognition of 'objects in themselves' or objects outside the mind; the ideas and sensations are copies or images of these objects. The opposite doctrine (idealism) says: the objects do not exist, outside the mind '; they are 'connections of sensations'."

Background
The book, whose full title is Materialism and Empirio-criticism. Critical Comments on a Reactionary Philosophy, was written by Lenin from February through October 1908 while he was exiled in Geneva and London and was published in Moscow in May 1909 by Zveno Publishers. The original manuscript and preparatory materials have been lost.

Most of the book was written when Lenin was in Geneva, apart from the one month spent in London, where he visited the library of the British Museum to access modern philosophical and natural science material. The index lists in excess of 200 sources for the book.

In December 1908, Lenin moved from Geneva to Paris, where he worked until April 1909 on correcting the proofs. Some passages were edited to avoid tsarist censorship. It was published in Imperial Russia with great difficulty. Lenin insisted on the rapid distribution of the book and stressed that "not only literary but also serious political obligations" were involved in its publication.

The book was written as a reaction and criticism to the three-volume work Empiriomonism (1904–1906) by Alexander Bogdanov, his political opponent within the Party. In June 1909, Bogdanov was defeated at a Bolshevik mini-conference in Paris and expelled from the Central Committee, but he still retained a relevant role in the Party's left wing. He participated in the Russian Revolution and after 1917, he was appointed director of the Socialist Academy of Social Sciences.

Materialism and Empirio-criticism was republished in Russian in 1920 with an introduction attacking Bogdanov by Vladimir Nevsky. It subsequently appeared in over 20 languages and acquired canonical status in Marxist–Leninist philosophy.

Chapters summary 

Chapter I The Epistemology of Empiriocriticism and Dialectical Materialism I
Lenin then discusses the "solipsism" of Mach and Avenarius.

Chapter II The Epistemology of Empiriocriticism and Dialectical Materialism II
Lenin, Chernov and Basarov confront the views of Ludwig Feuerbach, Joseph Dietzgen and Friedrich Engels and comment on the criterion of practice in epistemology.

Chapter III The Epistemology of Empiriocriticism and Dialectical Materialism III
Lenin seeks to define "matter" and "experience" and addresses the questions of causality and necessity in nature as well as "freedom and necessity" and the "principle of the economy of thought".

Chapter IV The philosophical idealists as collaborators and successors of empirio-criticism
Lenin deals with left and right Kant criticism, with the philosophy of immanence, Bogdanov's empiriomonism, and the critique of Hermann von Helmholtz on the "theory of symbols."

Chapter V The latest revolution in science and philosophical idealism
Lenin deals with the thesis that "the crisis of physics" "has disappeared matter". In this context he speaks of a "physical idealism" and notes (on p. 260): "For the only" property "of matter to whose acknowledgment philosophical materialism is bound is the property of being objective reality, outside of our consciousness."

Chapter VI Empiriocriticism and Historical Materialism
Lenin discusses authors such as Bogdanov, Suvorov, Ernst Haeckel and Ernst Mach.

In an addition to Chapter IV, Lenin addresses the question: "From what side did N. G. Chernyshevsky criticize Kantianism?"

Philosophers and scientists cited
Lenin cites a broad range of philosophers:

Immanentist
 Richard Avenarius
 Ernst Mach
 Richard von Schubert-Soldern

Russian Machists

 Jakov Berman
 Osip Helfond
 Sergei Suvorov
 Pavel Yushkevich

See also 
 Anti-Dühring
 Empirio-criticism
 Vladimir Lenin bibliography

Notes

Further reading
 Robert V. Daniels: A Documentary History of Communism in Russia: From Lenin to Gorbachev, 1993, .

External links
 Materialism and Empirio-criticism by Vladimir Lenin at the Marxists Internet Archive
 Materialism and Empirio-criticism, a PDF version published by Progress Publishers

1909 non-fiction books
Works by Vladimir Lenin
Materialism
Marxism
Academic works about philosophy
Epistemology literature
Dialectical materialism